The 2000–01 Creighton Bluejays men's basketball team represented Creighton University during the 2000–01 NCAA Division I men's basketball season. The Bluejays, led by head coach Dana Altman, played their home games at the Omaha Civic Auditorium. The Jays finished with a 24-8 record, and won the Missouri Valley Conference regular season title to earn an at-large bid to the 2001 NCAA tournament.

Roster

Schedule
 
|-
!colspan=9| Regular season

|-
!colspan=9| Missouri Valley Conference tournament

|-
!colspan=9| 2001 NCAA tournament

References

Creighton
Creighton
Creighton Bluejays men's basketball seasons
Creighton Bluejays men's bask
Creighton Bluejays men's bask